Narayanpet Assembly constituency is a constituency of Telangana Legislative Assembly, India. It is one of 14 constituencies in Mahbubnagar district. It is part of Mahbubnagar Lok Sabha constituency.

Currently the constituency is held by Telangana Rashtra Samithi leader S. Rajender Reddy.

Mandals
The Assembly Constituency presently comprises the following Mandals:

Members of Legislative Assembly

Telangana Legislative Assembly election, 2018

See also
 List of constituencies of Telangana Legislative Assembly

References

Assembly constituencies of Telangana
Mahbubnagar district